Soosilla is a village in Kambja Parish, Tartu County, Estonia. It has a population of 48 (as of 1 September 2010).

References

Villages in Tartu County